Tabivere was a rural municipality of Estonia, in Jõgeva County. It had a population of 2468 (2006) and an area of 201 km².

Populated places
Tabivere Parish had 1 small borough and 24 villages.

 Small borough
Tabivere

 Villages
Elistvere - Juula - Kaiavere - Kaitsemõisa - Kärksi - Kassema - Kõduküla - Kõnnujõe - Koogi - Kõrenduse - Lilu - Maarja-Magdaleena - Otslava - Õvanurme - Pataste - Raigastvere - Reinu - Sepa - Sortsi - Tormi - Uhmardu - Vahi - Valgma - Voldi

See also
Elistvere Animal Park

References

External links